The International Anti-Bribery and Fair Competition Act of 1998 is a United States federal law that amends the Foreign Corrupt Practices Act by implementing the provisions of the Organisation for Economic Co-operation and Development's Convention on Combating Bribery of Foreign Public Officials in International Business Transactions.

The act makes it illegal for a citizen or corporation of the United States or a person or corporation acting within the United States to influence, bribe or seek an advantage from a public official of another country.

See also
Convention against Corruption (disambiguation)

External links
Text of the bill

References

United States business law
United States federal criminal legislation
Corruption in the United States
Bribery
Acts of the 105th United States Congress